The 2005 Scottish League Cup final was played on 20 March 2005 at Hampden Park in Glasgow and was the final of the 58th Scottish League Cup. 

The final was contested by Rangers and Motherwell. Rangers won the match 5–1, with goals from Maurice Ross, Fernando Ricksen, Nacho Novo and a double from Sotirios Kyrgiakos.

The match was popularly known as "The Cooper Final", in honour of Davie Cooper, who was a prominent player for both clubs. Cooper had died almost 10 years to the day before the 2005 League Cup final was played.

Match details

Notes 

2005
Scottish League Cup Final 2005
Scottish League Cup Final 2005
League Cup Final
2000s in Glasgow